Valentina Paniagua (born 19 April 1994) is a Colombian professional track and road racing cyclist. She won the Colombian National Road Race Championships in 2014. She competed in the team pursuit event at the 2014 UCI Track Cycling World Championships.

Major results
2014
3rd Team Pursuit, Central American and Caribbean Games (with Jessica Parra, Jannie Milena Salcedo Zambrano and Lorena Maria Vargas Villamil)

References

External links
 

1994 births
Living people
Colombian female cyclists
Place of birth missing (living people)
20th-century Colombian women
21st-century Colombian women
Competitors at the 2014 Central American and Caribbean Games